Milton (2016 census population 110,128) is a town in Southern Ontario, Canada, and part of the Halton Region in the Greater Toronto Area. Between 2001 and 2011, Milton was the fastest growing municipality in Canada, with a 71.4% increase in population from 2001 to 2006 and another 56.5% increase from 2006 to 2011. In 2016, Milton's census population was 110,128 with an estimated growth to 228,000 by 2031. It remained the fastest growing community in Ontario but was deemed to be the sixth fastest growing in Canada at that time.

Milton is situated on the Niagara Escarpment, a UNESCO world biosphere reserve and the Bruce Trail.

History
The Mississaugas of the Credit held 648,000 acres of land north of the Head of the Lake Purchase lands and extending to the unceded territory of the Chippewa of Lakes Huron and Simcoe. In mid-October, 1818, the Chippewa ceded their land to the Crown in the Lake Simcoe-Nottawasaga Treaty and, by the end of October, the Crown sought to purchase the adjacent lands of the Mississaugas of the Credit. 
The Deputy Superintendent of the Indian Department, William Claus, met with the Mississaugas from October 27–29, 1818, and proposed that the Mississaugas sell their 648,000 acres of land in exchange for an annual amount of goods. The continuous inflow of settlers into their lands and fisheries had weakened the Mississaugas’ traditional economy and had left them in a state of impoverishment and a rapidly declining population. In their enfeebled state, Chief Ajetance (d. 1829), on behalf of the assembled people, readily agreed to the sale of their lands for £522.10 of goods paid annually.
Significant municipalities found within the lands of the Ajetance Purchase of 1818 include Brampton and Milton.

The town took root out of a settlement by Jasper Martin along the Sixteen Mile Creek; Martin immigrated from Newcastle upon Tyne, England with his wife Sarah Coates and two sons on May 17, 1818. Martin was granted  of land, from the Crown in 1820, designated Lot 14, Concession 2, Township of Trafalgar, Halton County, in the District of Gore. Martin built a grist mill along the creek and created a pond, known as Mill Pond, to power his mill. The mill became the centre of settlement for others as they settled in the region. In 1837 the area had a population of approximately 100 people and was named after the English poet John Milton. The town, as it is today, soon after became known as Milton. The two principal property owners of the young town were the Martins and the Fosters, whose names are still reflected in numerous buildings and streets in Milton

By 1855, the United Counties of Halton and Wentworth split, and Halton became a separate county. Its council consisted of members representing the townships of Esquesing, Nassagaweya, Trafalgar and Nelson, along with Acton, Georgetown, Milton, Burlington and Oakville. Milton was then named as the county town (seat), a decision that certainly created a lot of local controversy. The people in Oakville were very upset because Oakville was an established place with a railway. Milton did not even have a railway, according to historian John McDonald. For 25 years there was this great rivalry. Every time county council tried to pass something to improve the Milton area, the Oakville councillors would often balk at it. Hugh Foster, of the aforementioned Foster family, donated  of land to the county to construct its administration building in Milton, which is still in place on Mary Street today and now used as the Milton Town Hall. Milton was incorporated into a town in 1857, after being chosen as county seat for Halton.

By 1869, Milton had a population of 1,000. Records from 1874 indicate that Milton had county buildings, a telegraph office, a foundry, a tannery, a woolen factory, a grist mill and a saw mill, a weekly newspaper and a number of stores.

In 1891, Milton used electricity to light its streets for the first time and in 1905 the Town purchased the Milton Electric Light Company and built its own power station.

In the early 1900s, Milton was well known because of the P.L. Robertson Manufacturing Company, the first to make socket-head screws. Although formed in Hamilton in 1907, the business relocated to Milton in 1908. P.L. Robertson was the inventor of the square-socket drive for screws.

In 1974, the present municipal structure was created when the Regional Municipality of Halton replaced Halton County. The new town of Milton added parts of the former township of Esquesing (most of this township comprises Halton Hills), all of Nassagaweya Township including the village of Campbellville, and the northern sections of Trafalgar and Nelson from (a 1962 annexation of the former townships) Oakville and Burlington respectively.

With the addition of the Niagara Escarpment lands, tourism, recreation, and heritage conservation have increased in importance. The Halton Region Museum, which has a large number of historic agricultural buildings, and the Halton County Radial Railway museum are located in Milton, as is Country Heritage Park (formerly the Ontario Agricultural Museum). Five large parks operated by Conservation Halton reside in the town, and Mohawk Raceway is located near Campbellville. It is also home to Maplehurst Correctional Complex, the Vanier Centre for Women and one of two criminal courthouses serving Halton Region.

Climate
Milton is classified as a humid continental climate (Dfb) in the Koppen climate classification system. The town has 4 distinct seasons and year round precipitation with warm, rainy summers with cool nights and long, cold, and snowy winters.

Demographics

An October 2019 report stated that the average household income was $111,875, that the unemployment rate was 5.7%, and that the crime rate per 100,000 residents was low, at 2,133.

Ethnicity 

Note: Totals greater than 100% due to multiple origin responses.

Language 
The 2021 census found that English was the mother tongue of 55.6% of the population. The next most common mother tongues were Urdu (9.7%), Arabic (4.1%), Spanish (2.3%), Punjabi (1.8%), Tagalog (Filipino) (1.5%), Polish (1.3%), Portuguese (1.3%), Mandarin (1.1%), French (1.1%), and Hindi (1.1%).

Religion 
According to the 2021 census, the religion with the most adherents in Milton is Christianity (48.2%). Other religions include Islam (23.1%), Hinduism (6.1%), Sikhism (2.4%), and Buddhism (0.6%), and  18.9% reported no religious affiliation.

Neighbourhoods
Milton's Planning Department divides the town into communities. These divisions have little to do with politics and are based on traditional neighbourhoods.

Education

Milton's public elementary and secondary schools are part of the Halton District School Board. Milton's Catholic elementary and secondary schools are part of the Halton Catholic District School Board. There are also several private schools in Milton.

In 2008, the town reached an agreement in principle with Wilfrid Laurier University for the latter to establish a satellite campus in Milton. Funding of $90 million for the Milton Education Village which would also include a Conestoga College satellite campus, on land donated by the town, was approved by the provincial government in April 2018. In October 2018 funding for the project was withdrawn by the new Ontario government (elected in June) before construction had begun. Mayor Gord Krantz indicated that the town would look for alternative funding.

As of the fall 2019 season, there were no reports of funding for a Milton campus but Wilfrid Laurier University was offering some services in town, including a Master of Education program at the Milton Education Village Innovation Centre and a Lecture Series. In summer, Laurier was operating the Enriched Academic Program (LEAP) day camp.

Halton District School Board
 Boyne Public School (JK–8)
 Anne J. MacArthur Public School (JK–8)
 Brookville Public School (JK–8)
 Bruce Trail Public School (JK–8)
 Chris Hadfield Public School (JK–8)
 Craig Kielburger Secondary School (9–12)
 E. C. Drury School for the Deaf (JK–12)
Elsie MacGill Secondary School (9–12)
  Escarpment View Public School (JK–8)
 E. W. Foster Public School (JK–5)
 Hawthorne Village Public School (JK–8)
 Irma Coulson Public School(JK–8)
 J. M. Denyes Public School (JK–5)
 Martin Street Public School (JK–7)
 Milton District High School (9–12)
 P. L. Robertson Public School (JK–8)
 Robert Baldwin Public School (JK–5)
 Sam Sherratt Public School (JK–8)
 Viola Desmond Public School (JK–8)
 W. I. Dick Middle School (6–8)
 Tiger Jeet Singh Public School (JK–8)

Halton Catholic District School Board
 Bishop Reding Catholic Secondary School (9–12)
 St. Francis Xavier Catholic Secondary School (9–12)
 Guardian Angels Catholic School (JK–8)
 Holy Rosary Catholic School (JK–8)
 Lumen Christi Catholic School (JK–8)
 Our Lady of Fatima Elementary School (JK–8)
 Our Lady of Victory School (JK–8)
 St. Anthony of Padua Catholic School (JK–8)
 St. Peter Catholic School (JK–8)
 Queen of Heaven Catholic Elementary School (JK–8)
 St. Benedict's Catholic Elementary School (JK–8)
 St. Scholastica Catholic Elementary School (JK-8)

Conseil Scolaire Catholique Mon Avenir  (French Catholic School Board)
 École Élémentaire St-Nicolas (JK–6)
 École Élémentaire Catholique Ste-Anne (JK–6)

Conseil Scolaire Viamonde (French Public School Board)
 École élémentaire Dyane-Adam (JK–6)

Private schools
 The Montessori Country School (Casa)
 Milton Christian School (JK–8)
 Keswick Sutherland School & Equestrian Centre (JK–8)
 Halton Waldorf School (JK–8)
 Hitherfield School (PK–8)
 Tarbiyah Elementary School (JK–8)
 Suffah Academy (JK–8)

Public library system
Milton is served by three libraries: the Main Library, the Beaty Branch, and the Sherwood Branch.

Theatre
The Milton Centre for the Arts, now known as FirstOntario Arts Centre, operated by the town, opened in 2012 and is a venue for events such as "music, theatre, dance, and art exhibits" in addition to special community events.

Semi-professional theatre is offered by groups such as the Milton Players who use the Arts Centre as their venue.

Government

Municipal
The Town of Milton has an elected town council headed by a Mayor, and 8 council members. The town is divided into four wards, each of which elect a local council representative and a Halton Region council representative. Milton is represented by the mayor and four regional councillors on the Halton Region council.

Town Council 2022–2026
 Mayor: Gordon Krantz
 Regional Councillor Ward 1: Colin Best
 Regional Councillor Ward 2: Rick Malboeuf
 Regional Councillor Ward 3: Sammy Ijaz
 Regional Councillor Ward 4: Sameera Ali
 Local Councillor Ward 1: Kristina Tesser Derksen
 Local Councillor Ward 2: John Challinor II
 Local Councillor Ward 3: Adil Khalqi
 Local Councillor Ward 4: Sarah Marshall

Krantz has been mayor since 1980, making him the current longest-serving mayor in Canada.

Previous mayors 

 George Brown, 1857
 Edward Martin, 1858–1859
 James McTuffin, 1860–1861
 William D. Lyon, 1862–1866
 George Smith, 1867–1869
 Clarkson Freeman, 1870–1872
 David Robertson, 1873–1876
 George Smith, 1877-
 John D. Matheson, 1881
 Johnson E. Harrison, Reeve (1882), Mayor of Milton (1899)
 Robert K. Anderson, 1904, 1907–1909
 John Maxted, 1928
 Edmund Syer, 1930
 Dr. Charles Ansley "Carl" Martin, Mayor, 1936
 Adam E. Armstrong, Mayor, 1940–41
 George H. Dawson, Mayor, 1942–1946
 Gordon Gowland, Mayor, 1947
 Dr. Cecil Hartley Heslop, 1948–51, 1954–55
 G. Frank Thompson, 1952–53
 E. Ross Pearen, Deputy Reeve 1953, Mayor 1956.
 Mike Ledwith, 1957
 Sydney G. Childs, 1958–1968
 Brian Best, 1968–1974
 Anne MacArthur, 1974–1976
 Don Gordon, 1976–1980

Halton Regional Council
 Mayor: Gordon Krantz
Local and Regional Councillor Ward 1: Colin Best 
Local and Regional Councillor Ward 2: Rick Malboeuf
 Local and Regional Councillor Ward 3: Mike Cluett
Local and Regional Councillor Ward 4: Zeeshan Hamid

Provincial

At the provincial level of government, Milton is contained within the Milton provincial riding.
 Member of Provincial Parliament: Parm Gill (Conservative)

Federal
At the federal level of government, Milton is contained within the Milton federal riding.
 Member of Parliament: Adam van Koeverden (Liberal) won the riding in the 2019 Canadian federal election on October 21, 2019. He was officially sworn in on November 22, 2019, with the next session of Parliament expected to commence on December 5.

Government services
Policing within Milton is provided by Halton Regional Police. Fire services are provided by the Milton Fire Department, with its five stations in the town. Patrol of provincially maintained highways is provided by the Ontario Provincial Police. Milton is home to the Royal Canadian Mounted Police Toronto West Detachment under "O" Division with 230 RCMP personnel as of late 2018; departments include Criminal Intelligence, Federal Operations Support, Financial Crime and Serious & Organized Crime.

The first section of the Milton District Hospital opened in 1959 and expanded in 1967. A major expansion in 2016-2017 provided an extra 330,000 square feet of health-care space. The Emergency Department, for example, was tripled in size, with a new capacity of 45,000 patient visits per year. The facility is part of the Halton Healthcare system that also includes hospitals in Georgetown, Ontario and in Oakville, Ontario.

In 1972, the Ontario government started a $13.5 million construction project for the Maplehurst Correctional Centre which was completed in 1974. A $79-million makeover began in 1997 and was completed in 2001. Today, the site houses the Maplehurst Correctional Complex and the Vanier Centre for Women.

Halton Region provides the following services to it communities, including Milton:Economic development
Emergency planning
Regional planning and growth management
Recycling and waste
Regional roads
Sewage (wastewater) collection systems and treatment plants
Water purification plants and distribution systems
Housing supports and services
Children and parenting
Employment and financial assistance
Ontario Works (social services)
Services for seniors
Paramedic services
Public health
Immunizations and preventable diseases
Food safety
Police services

Service clubs
Major service clubs include The Rotary Club of Milton, the Milton Lions Club, the Optimist Club of Milton and the Milton & District Kinsmen Club.

Transportation

Roads
There are three main arterial east-west regional roads that run through urban Milton: Halton Regional Road #6 or Britannia Road in the south, Halton Regional Road #7 or Derry Road in central Milton, and Halton Regional Road #8 or Steeles Avenue in the north. Three north-south regional roads bisect the town: Halton Regional Road #22 or Tremaine Road in the west; Halton Regional Road #25 or Highway 25 as Ontario Street through the middle of town linking Milton to Acton in the north and Bronte (Oakville) in the south; and Halton Regional Road #4 or James Snow Parkway in the east. A number of improvements have been undertaken since 2009 to increase capacity and alleviate delays due to congestion and train traffic on these numbered regional roads.

Highway 401 bisects the Town and effectively separates the mainly rural and industrial areas to the north from the primarily residential and commercial developments in the southern part of town. The highway was to be widened to ten lanes from the James Snow Parkway to west of Regional Road 25, in a major project, starting in autumn 2019.

Bridges
A number of overpass and underpass projects have been constructed in recent years for the grade separation of railway crossings, including on Britannia Road, Derry Road, Main Street, and James Snow Parkway.

Public transportation

Milton Transit is the municipal provider of bus services for the town. Milton Transit provides conventional and Milton access+ (paratransit) service, operating on weekdays and Saturdays, with connections to routes and GO Transit services at the Milton GO Station.

Milton Transit has delivered service since the early 1980s in various forms. With recommendations from the North Halton Transit Strategy, Council approved the delivery of a contracted, fixed-route transit system in 2004. Milton Transit officially launched conventional service in August later that year and began purchasing its own branded buses in 2008.

Milton Transit service is provided by a private service provider under contract, PWTransit Canada, who employ bus operators and maintain Milton Transit fleet. Vehicles include 23 low floor buses for full accessibility. In 2018, the town cited 552,654 revenue passenger trips and approximately 400 active bus stops in the community.

Intercity service is served by GO Transit via buses and trains. Commuter service to and from Toronto is the key routing, with some buses connecting to Oakville. On October 31, 2009, GO Transit started service with a line from Square One Shopping Centre in Mississauga to the University of Waterloo, therefore allowing a trip to Kitchener and Cambridge.

Railways

Freight trains on the main Montreal-Toronto-Chicago CP line and a secondary CN line are a common sight in Milton. The town at present has very little passenger rail service in comparison to other GTA communities with only one-way, weekday peak-service inbound to Toronto in the morning, and outbound from Toronto in the evening. The nearest Via Rail station in the Toronto-New York City corridor is Oakville station.

The most easily accessible GO Transit railway station is Milton station.

Canadian National Railway planned to build an "intermodal" or "truck-rail hub" facility on rural land in the south of the town (bordered by Tremaine Rd., Britannia Rd. and Lower Base Line) that would be used to transfer freight between trucks and trains. According to a late-July 2019 news report, the plan was controversial with "local mayors and residents voicing objections over potential congestion and environmental impacts" because of the "estimated 1,600 daily truck trips" that the facility would require. Public hearings had been completed by that time. A three person panel was to file its recommendations by early 2020 to the Minister of Environment and Climate Change. Halton Region was also lobbying against the planned facility and stated another area of concern in late 2018:Additionally, CN has only revealed its plans for 400 acres on the site; they have not disclosed its plans for the remaining 800 acres. We have determined that the operations at this site can be significantly expanded which will further increase the impacts on residents and the community.

Air
The nearest airport to Milton is the Burlington Airpark in neighboring Burlington, Ontario. It is a thriving general-aviation field, but the airport does not have any regular commercial passenger flight service. Some charter operations are provided.

Pearson International Airport, Canada's largest passenger-volume airport, is located only  to the east.

Sports

Milton Sports Hall of Fame
Milton has a long sports history. In 2016, that history was formally recognized through a joint community-municipal project with the creation of the Milton Sports Hall of Fame. A volunteer committee was stuck in 2014. The inaugural class of inductees was announced in August 2016, with the formal induction ceremony taking place on November 24, 2016. A wall of fame to recognize the inaugural inductees as well as future inductees has been constructed in the Milton Sports Centre.

Badminton 
Milton Badminton Club operates up to nine courts within the in-field of the Mattamy National Cycling Centre. The club is officially affiliated with Badminton Canada and the Ontario Badminton Association, and actively participates in the district's league plays, junior circuits, as well as various Ontario tournaments. Programs are provided for players 9+ years old.

Tennis 
The Town of Milton operates tennis courts in parks such as Bronte Meadows Park, Optimist Park and Rotary Outdoor Park. Private organizations are the Milton Tennis Club and the Nassagaweya Tennis Club.

Baseball
Baseball has a long history in Milton, particularly in Campbellville where it had its beginnings with the Lumberman's Baseball Club as early as 1872. It really flourished as a "community tradition" in the 1920s and 30s, and again in the 1950s and 60s with the Campbellville Intermediate Baseball Team, which won numerous county and provincial titles in a 16-year span from 1952 to 1967. A grandstand and club house was erected in 1960 in Campbellville to make room for the 2,000 spectators that would descend on the hamlet. In 1953, the Campbellville Baseball Club won the OBA Intermediate C Championship in just its second year in the league, before repeating again and again. Managed by Len Andrews, the men's Campbellville Merchants baseball team won 11 consecutive Halton county league titles, as well as 12 Ontario Championship titles between 1952-1967, an amazing feat for a hamlet of 300 at the time. Known as the Merchants, the intermediate men's squad (1952-67 era) was inducted into the Baseball Ontario Hall of Fame in 2014. Campbellville teams won four more provincial titles between 1968 and 1984.

Minor baseball in Milton was formally recognized through the incorporation of the Milton Minor Baseball Association as Baseball Milton in 1985. Programs range from junior t-ball all the way to midget, with house, select and rep leagues. Teams are known as the Milton Mets. In 2016, the Milton Mets major rookie team captured the boys' COBA Triple-A title.

Basketball
The Milton Stags are a youth basketball club and affiliated member club of Basketball Ontario and Basketball Canada.

Cricket 
Cricket activities in Milton started in 2002 from the play fields around Bishop Reding School and later in 2012 from the turf pitch at the Boyne park. Initially, cricket was played in the T-10 format using tape tennis balls. Around 2012, Sal Saeed (president - MCGA) worked with Milton town to setup the first authentic cricket field at Sherwood park. Currently, there are multiple clubs in Milton participating in various indoor/outdoor tournaments.

Curling
Milton Curling Club is a member-owned volunteer club with four sheets of ice and is open from October to April.

Cycling
The Niagara Escarpment forms an excellent natural training ground for mountain biking and road cycling in Milton. Milton is also home to the Mattamy National Cycling Centre, opened in 2015, which includes the headquarters and practice facilities for Cycling Canada, as well as Canadian Cycling Hall of Fame.

Golf
In 1978, Milton's 15-year-old Stan Fay became Ontario Junior Golf Champion. He also simultaneously won the juvenile crown as well. There are 10 golf courses within Milton. After Fay was diagnosed with Parkinson's, an annual charity golf tournament was established to help raise funds for the disease.

Gymnastics
Milton Springers Gymnastics Club have existed since 1974.

Hockey

In 1942, the Milton Bricks Tigers won an OHA Junior "C" title. Milton defeated Oakville to advance to the semi-finals and Parry Sound to move on to the finals against the Preston Riversides. In the Schmalz Cup best of three series, which was held at Maple Leaf Gardens, Milton won game one by a score of 6-4, with three goals coming from Milton's future NHL player Enio Sclisizzi, and game two by a score of 10-1. This victory came on the heels of a loss in the finals three years earlier versus Aurora.

NHLer and four-time Stanley Cup champion John Tonelli is the most well-known hockey player to come from Milton. There is a Milton arena named in his honour. NHL referee Bruce Hood and linesman Leon Stickle are also Milton products.

A banner hockey year came in 1976 when the Milton Tridents Intermediate B team won the Southern Counties league championship over the Tillsonburg Maroons in seven games, and the Docs and Dents minor atom team won the OMHA Central Ontario zone championship. The Docs and Dents were the first Milton minor hockey team to go undefeated in the Tri-County league, winning 26 games and tying two.

The Milton Icehawks were a Junior "A" ice hockey team in the Ontario Junior A Hockey League. They are one of the most historical teams in the Ontario Junior Hockey League, having been formed in 1966.

Trucking magnate Brad Grant purchased the team in the late 1980s when it seemed like the organization might fold, and led the team to tremendous success in the late 1990s. During his 15-year ownership run, the team captured four division crowns, three league championships and a provincial title. In 2001, Grant sold the team to an Oakville trio that consisted of ex-NHLer Dave Gagner, Mario Forgione, who owned the Mississauga IceDogs at the time and was an automotive parts manufacturing president, and wine distillery consultant Ken Chase.

For the 2003–04 season, Forgione changed the team's name from the Merchants to the IceHawks to reflect the team's connection with the local minor hockey programs called the Winterhawks, and Forgione's ownership of the Mississauga IceDogs. In 2006, Forgione officially affiliated the Icehawks with the IceDogs.

In the spring of 2006, ex-NHL goaltender Rick Heinz' attempt to purchase the nearby Tier-2 Junior Georgetown Raiders fell through, but by July 2006 the local Campbellville resident Heinz had talked Forgione into selling the Icehawks, and the affiliation with the IceDogs ended. Heinz sold the team just nine months later after starting the season with essentially no committed players. Dean Piett, a commercial real estate businessman from Burlington, and Rob DeVincentis, the Ancaster owner of a construction business, purchased the team from Heinz and have owned the team ever since the sale in 2007. Both Piett and DeVincetis had a son playing on the team in 2008, which led to friction amongst other players.

The Icehawks (2003–2018) have previously been known as the Milton Flyers (1979–1981), Milton Steamers (1981–1986), and Milton Merchants (1986–2003). Many notable players have suited up for Milton over the years, including NHL stars John Tavares, Daniel Carcillo, Sam Gagner, Rich Peverley, Darren Haydar and Matt Read.

The new Milton Menace Hockey Club, a Junior A hockey franchise, was formed from the Newmarket Hurricane team, purchased in early March 2019. The 2019–2020 season was the club's first, with games at the Milton Memorial Arena.

Running
Milton was represented by distance runner Ed Whitlock, who held numerous age-related records for the marathon, half-marathon and long-distance track events, both indoor and outdoor. Milton's Ben Preisner represented Canada at the 2020 Summer Olympics in Tokyo.

Skating
The town offers drop-in skating at several arenas; some of those also feature competitive skating events. Private organizations include the Milton Skating Club and Milton Speed Skating.

In 1976, Milton's Kevin Parker won a Canadian national novice skating title in London.

Skiing
The Niagara Escarpment forms an excellent natural training ground for skiing in Milton. It is also the site of Glen Eden ski area, where Olympian and Miltonian Travis Gerrits got his start.

Soccer
Milton soccer is represented by the Milton Youth Soccer Club. MYSC was incorporated in 1988 and has been serving the town of Milton ever since. It is a non-profit, volunteer organization. The club has over 3,300 players who play house-league, development and rep each year. Ages for teams range from U4 to U18 and including adult.

The Milton Magic soccer team of the Youth Soccer Club competes in various Soccer Ontario events. In 2019, their BU15 and BU16 Blue teams advanced into the Ontario Cup Finals.

Halton Hawks FC is the smallest of the Youth Clubs in Milton. HHFC was incorporated in 2002, is a non-profit organization. and operates out of Bennett Park, in the heart of Milton. Halton Hawks FC is an Ontario Soccer Association sanctioned Club. HHFC is an official Academy of Tranmere Rovers FC an English second division soccer Club. HHFC offers programs for development and rep each year. Ages for teams U7-U17.

Milton SC are currently representing Milton in the Canadian Soccer League after joining the league in the 2014 season. Milltown Football Club was a soccer club based in Milton, playing in Division 1 of the Peel Halton Soccer League. Milltown FC joined the Canadian Soccer League in the 2010 season as an expansion club but opted out of the league after one season due to disagreement over membership terms and conditions.

Swimming
The Milton Marlins are youth-focused swim team based out of the Milton Sports Centre. Coach and swim trainer Carole Murray was instrumental in teaching thousands of kids in Milton how to swim from the 1970s until she sold her swim school in 2006. She won a coach of the year award from the federal government in 1988. She was also a coach for the Marlins. Under her watch Campbellville's Alicia Hicken competed in the Canadian Olympic Trials and Canadian Winter Nationals in 1991.

As of November 2019, the Head Coach of the club was Meghan Whittaker.

Some Marlins swimmers qualified for the Olympic Trials for the 2016 Rio Olympics.

Parks and recreation
Milton has many conservation parks, campgrounds and recreational areas. The conservation parks in the Milton area are owned by Conservation Halton, a conservation authority.

 Bruce Trail
 Conservation Halton
 Crawford Lake Conservation Area
 Drumquin Park BMX track & Oakville Model Flying Club
 Glen Eden Ski & Snowboard Centre
 John Tonelli Sports Centre
 Kelso Conservation Area
 Milton Curling Club
 Milton Minor Hockey Association (Milton Winterhawks)
 Milton Mill Pond & Rotary Park
 Milton Heights Campgrounds
 Milton Leisure Centre
 Milton Memorial Arena
 Milton Skating Club
 Milton Sports Centre Arena
 Mohawk Raceway
 Mount Nemo Conservation Area
 Mountsberg Conservation Area
 Rattlesnake Point
 Rotary Park
 Springridge Farm

Media
Milton is covered by local newspapers, radio, magazines and websites through the following services:
 The Canadian Champion
 Milton Villager
 DiscoverMilton.com
 SNAP Milton
 The Milton Blog
 The Cliffhanger
 The GTA Times
 FM 101 Milton CJML

Local events
 Every Labour Day weekend the Milton Steam-Era takes place. Steam-Era is the annual show produced by the "Ontario Steam & Antique Preservers Association," currently held on 88 acres at County Heritage Park, after decades at the Milton Fairgrounds. Steam engines from the 19th century puff their way around the grounds. Hundreds of tractors and stationary engines, along with antique cars, models and agricultural displays recreate life in the country 100 years ago. The 2020 event will celebrate the 60th anniversary of Steam-Era.
 The Milton Fall Fair is held every year on the last weekend of September. The Fall Fair has been a tradition in the town for over 160 years. Events include an agricultural show, midway, livestock, entertainment, the Demolition Derby and other traditional county fair events. The event takes place at the Milton Fairgrounds located in the historic downtown area of Milton.
 Culture Days is a weekend long celebration of arts and culture in Milton featuring free interactive events for all ages and held during the last weekend of September. Organized by Arts Milton, Culture Days is held each year at the FirstOntario Arts Centre.
 A farmers' market operates on Main Street in downtown Milton on Saturdays 8am-Noon, from May through October. The section of Main Street that hosts the market is closed off to vehicles during the event.
 The Downtown Milton Street Festival - annual event in June attracts over 90,000 people and includes live entertainment, vendors and local businesses.
 Miracle on Main Street - Tiger Jeet Singh Foundations' annual toy drive.

Development

The town has very easy access throughout the GTA by Highways 401 and 407 towards Oakville, Burlington and Hamilton on the town, or by the former Highway 25 (Halton Road 25). There are two key freight railway routes (both by CN and CP), passenger services from GO Transit, and Via Rail passenger connections in the Quebec City–Windsor Corridor in both neighbouring Oakville and Georgetown. There is close proximity to Toronto Pearson International Airport along Highway 401 (under 40 km from 401/Halton 25 exit).

Milton Transit was developed in 1972 to provide public transportation service throughout the urban centre, as well as a feeder route for GO Transit trains and buses.

While most of the development is suburban in nature, larger industrial lots are being developed closer to the escarpment. The major industries in Milton are automotive, advanced manufacturing, distribution and food production.

The town published a Current Development Map and also a Future Urban Structure Map - Building Possibility document that indicates the general plan for the use of lands in future, intended to "minimize further expansion of urban areas and unnecessary and inefficient consumption of land".

1970s growth
In 1978, the Ontario Municipal Board approved the Alliance Ex-Urban project, paving the way for a 532-unit plan, which broke ground with an initial 180 houses at Bronte St. and Derry Rd. in 1979.

A further 600 detached and semi-detached houses were completed in 1979, as Timberlea moved into phase two of its construction. Phase One saw 300 homes built in the Timberlea area bounded by Derry Rd., Thompson Rd. and Ontario St. S. The final Timberlea village includes 1,400 homes.

An additional 30 homes were built in 1979 by Kingsway Plastering on Commercial St, and 10 new units in Campbellville's McLaren Subdivision. A 107-unit apartment complex was also completed in 1979 on Millside Drive.

Building permit totals in 1976 reached $28 million, before dipping in 1977, and rebounding to nearly $23 million in 1978. In 1979, the estimated total building permit revenue reached $100 million.

By 1979, the town zoning administrator stated that, due to drinking water limitations at the time, completion of the Timberlea and Alliance projects would "complete all the residential development that can go into the town." For the next 20 years, very little growth occurred in Milton.

21st century
Residential growth has increased substantially since 2002 due to completion of "The Big Pipe" project; designed to deliver water to the town from Lake Ontario. Since then, Milton developed an initial seven new subdivisions, including Hawthorne Village, and several new ones are under development by Mattamy Homes and various other builders. Multiple new grade schools have been built, as well as the Crossroads Centre shopping plaza that includes various major retail stores and restaurants. An eight-screen movie theatre is operated by Cineplex Entertainment under their Galaxy Cinemas brand and opened on June 30, 2006.

In July 2014, Milton council approved 11 new residential applications that will see an additional 6,000 homes built, increasing the population by roughly 25,000 new residents. In 2013-14, Milton approved construction of a track-cycling velodrome venue for the 2015 Pan American Games called the Mattamy National Cycling Centre. The facility sits at the heart of a 150-acre plot of land that is designated for a proposed future Wilfrid Laurier University campus.

A mid 2019 report stated that roughly 3,100 high-density residential units were being planned or being built in the town.

A mid-2019 report discussed two new subdivisions being planned, Agerton (along Trafalgar Road east of the 401), "for a mixed-use employment and higher-density residential community" and Trafalgar, a "mixed-use, transit-supportive, higher-density community ... along Trafalgar Road between Derry Road to south of Britannia Road". The  Milton Education Village area was to be further developed, as an urban neighbourhood with post-secondary education, residential, commercial and recreational segments.

Official Plan
As of November 2019, the town was using the Official Plan approved by Halton Region on December 14, 1997, and by the Ontario Municipal Board (OMB) on July 19, 1999. Public meetings were scheduled for late 2019 to obtain residents' comments on changes that might be appropriate for the next Official Plan.

Commerce
The villages of Milton Heights and Peru are unique in Milton, as they were the centres of industrial rather than farming communities. This has given this part of Milton a unique character that has left a legacy in the buildings and people that remain in the area. From the 1850s and '60s until 1877, a lumber mill operated in the area, as well as a saw mill in the mid-1800s. The railway fueled industry when it opened in 1879 in Milton.

The area was traditionally famous for quarrying and the production of building materials such as lime, limestone and bricks, which started in the 1880s. These industries were of provincial significance and, at their peak at the turn of the 20th century, they employed hundreds of people in the Milton Heights and Peru areas.

In addition, the materials that were produced here were used in many of the buildings in both urban and rural Milton as well as in buildings throughout Ontario. These were huge industrial operations for their time and they attracted considerable immigration to Milton.

Early industry in Milton consisted of the Milton Pressed Brick Company, which started in the 1880s, and the P.L. Robertson screw factory, which started in 1908.

An August 2017 report indicated that Mattamy Homes' Halton/Hamilton Divisional Office was located in Milton. Other companies with Canadian head offices, or a major employment presence, in Milton include:
 3M Canada
 Chudleigh's Limited
 Dare Foods
 DSV Canada
 Dufferin Aggregates Milton Quarry 
 Gordon Food Service (592 employees)
 Johnson Controls
 Karmax Heavy Stamping, a division of Magna International (950 employees)
 Lowe's distribution centre
 Manheim Auto Auctions (750 employees)
 Modatek Systems, a division of Magna International
 Northstar Aerospace
 Rockwool (formerly branded as Roxul) 
 Whirlpool Canada
 Wolseley Canada distribution centre

A 2017 summary of the benefits of Milton as a location for industry stated that the town's "proximity to the 400-series highways, rail links, and international airports, as well as the municipality’s commitment to economic development, have all helped drive Milton’s dynamic growth".

The town's mid-2019 report highlighted three major new facilities in Milton: Kimberly-Clark's  of warehouse and distribution, Prologis'  of warehouse space leased to Jaguar Land Rover and Sun Life Financial's planned  of speculative industrial building.

The mid-2019 report also listed new businesses that had opened facilities in town in 2018: PBS Systems Group, Infrastructure Ontario, Enable Education, Responsive Consulting and Throwback Entertainment. At that time, the Derry Green Business Park Development was underway; the plan was "accommodate a mix of businesses including innovative logistics, advanced manufacturing and distribution facilities" in this new area.

Town finances
The town's 2018 Budget report stated that gross revenue for 2018 was $187.2 million and that expenses totaled $118.1 million; much of the net revenue came from charges made to developers. Financial assets totaled $106.3 million at year's end, while liabilities totaled $12.6 million. Milton's long-term debenture debt decreased to $42.7 million.

Notable people

 Ernie Coombs, star of children's TV program Mr. Dressup
 Susan Delacourt, political journalist
 David James Elliott, actor on CBS show JAG
 Ben Gulak, inventor best known for creating the Uno, an eco-friendly, electric-powered vehicle
 Colonel Chris Hadfield, astronaut
 George Sherwood Hume, geologist
 P. L. Robertson, inventor of the Robertson socket-head screw and screwdriver

Music
 Danny Brooks, blues and Memphis-style R&B musician
 Deadmau5, progressive house music producer and performer
The Most Serene Republic, indie band signed to Arts & Crafts

Politics and public service
 Robert Baldwin, MP of Upper Canada
 Ernest Charles Drury, 8th Premier of Ontario
 Otto Jelinek, federal politician; represented Halton and Oakville; world champion and Olympic figure skater
 Betty Kennedy, broadcaster, journalist, author, and retired Canadian Senator
 Joseph Martin, 13th Premier of British Columbia
 Benjamin Franklin McGregor, farmer and political figure in Saskatchewan
 Mark Saunders, Chief of Police, Toronto Police Service
 James Snow, politician and Ontario's longest serving Minister of Transportation

Sports

 Kayla Alexander, WNBA player
 Scott Bertoli, hockey player
 Steve Bice, curler
 Kwaku Boateng, football player, graduated from Bishop Reding
 Mat Clark, hockey player
 Jeff Daw, hockey forward
 Darren Eliot, hockey goaltender and Olympian
 Mark French, hockey coach
 Travis Gerrits, Olympic aerial skier and 2013 world silver medalist
 Brad Grant, former owner of the Milton Icehawks; standardbred horse owner; president of Active Transport and John Grant Haulage trucking companies
 Darren Haydar, hockey player
 Shawn Hill, baseball pitcher, attended Bishop Reding Catholic Secondary School
 Bruce Melvin Hood, hockey referee
 Bob Izumi, TV personality and professional angler
 Mike Kaszycki, hockey player
 Peter McDuffe, hockey player
 Joey Melo, soccer player
 Matt O'Meara, football player
 Pierre Pilote, hockey player
 Ben Preisner, Olympic marathoner
 Jim Ridley, baseball player and MLB scout
 Ronald Roberts, WHA and NHL hockey executive
 Enio Sclisizzi, former NHL player
 Matt Sewell, football player
 Michael Sgarbossa, hockey player
 Tiger Ali Singh, professional wrestler
 Tiger Jeet Singh, professional wrestler
 Harvey Sproule, hockey player, coach, owner, executive, and referee; curler; journalist; race horse owner
 Leon Stickle, NHL linesman
 John Tonelli, hockey player
 Kirsten Wall, curler and Olympic gold medallist
 Steve Webb, hockey player
 Ed Whitlock, oldest person in the world to run a marathon under three hours

Sister cities
  Santa Maria, Bulacan, Philippines (since July 6, 1999)

Notes

References

External links

 
Lower-tier municipalities in Ontario
Populated places established in 1857
Towns in Ontario